Nathan Andrew Torrence (born December 1, 1977) is an American comedic actor known for several TV and film roles, most notably including Devon from She's Out of My League, Wade from HBO‘s Hello Ladies, Sully on the CW series Supernatural and for voicing the character of Clawhauser in Disney’s animated film Zootopia.

Early life
Torrence was born in Canton, Ohio, where he began his education. Torrence attended Hiland High School in Berlin, Ohio, and went on to attend Kent State University: Stark Campus. His family used to own and operate a bed and breakfast in Berlin. After studying with Second City's Players Workshop in Chicago, Illinois, Torrence began touring in a comedy troupe called Corn, Beef and Cabbage, where he wrote, improvised and performed with his older brother, Jay and friend Josh Ruth. Torrence additionally studied improv at Second City in Cleveland and in Los Angeles, and The Groundlings and Comedy Sportz in Los Angeles.

Career
Torrence has appeared on television programs including CSI: Crime Scene Investigation, Malcolm in the Middle, How I Met Your Mother, Las Vegas, Brooklyn Nine-Nine, House M.D., and Ghost Whisperer. He had a recurring role as Dylan Killington on the NBC drama Studio 60 on the Sunset Strip and played Roman Cohen in the ABC network short-lived comedy Mr. Sunshine, a midseason replacement for the 2010-11 television season.

He is perhaps best known for his role as a credit card customer service representative with David Spade, in the Capital One "What's In Your Wallet" advertising campaign. He has also appeared in several other commercials, including for Enterprise Rent-A-Car, Volkswagen, Golden Grahams, H-E-B, and NFL.com.

In December 2006, Torrence appeared in a season two episode of Top Chef on Bravo TV. The contestants were showcasing holiday food; Nate Torrence was one of the tasters, although he is not credited.

He played Lloyd, a lab assistant, in the film Get Smart and reprised the role to star in the direct-to-DVD spinoff Get Smart's Bruce and Lloyd: Out of Control. Torrence has also played a crazy shirtless boxer on Reno 911!, and Devon in the 2010 comedy She's Out of My League.

He voices Chuck on the animated show Motorcity and played Wade Bailey in the HBO series Hello Ladies. In the 2013-14 TV season, he was the recurring character "James" on the ABC comedy Super Fun Night, and he guest-starred on a 2014 Brooklyn Nine-Nine episode as a costumed vigilante named "Super Dan". Torrence appeared as Eric Lewandowski on the Fox sitcom Weird Loners and voices Ferguson on the animated show Star vs. the Forces of Evil. In 2015, he appeared on the episode of Supernatural entitled "Just My Imagination" as Sully, Sam's imaginary friend. In 2016, he had a voice role in the animated hit Zootopia, as Officer Benjamin Clawhauser.

Filmography

Film

Television

References

External links

1977 births
American male film actors
American male television actors
Living people
Actors from Canton, Ohio